Chansa may refer to:

 Francis Chansa, Congolese football goalkeeper
 Isaac Chansa, Zambian footballer
 Wisdom Mumba Chansa, Zambian footballer
 Chansa Kabwela, Zambian journalist